The Board of Directors is an LP album recorded at the A & R Recording Studios in New York City on November 20–21, 1967 and released in 1968, featuring the Mills Brothers with Count Basie and orchestra.
The arrangements and conducting were by Dick Hyman, and the sound engineer was Phil Ramone.

The theme of the title was taken from the Basie band album recorded in April 1958, Chairman of the Board (reissued 1970 by Roulette Records). It was resumed in 1968 in the follow-up album The Board of Directors Annual Report, also with the Mills Brothers (Dot Records).

Track listing 
"Up a Lazy River" - 3:27
"I May Be Wrong But I Think You're Wonderful" (Frank Foster solo) - 3:07
"Release Me" - 2:39
"I Want to Be Happy" (Eric Dixon flute solo) - 1:56
"Down-Down-Down (What a Song)" - 2:31
"The Whiffenpoof Song" - 3:07
"I Dig Rock and Roll Music" - 3:00
"Tiny Bubbles" - 3:10
"December" - 2:41
"Let Me Dream" - 2:46
"April in Paris" - 4:03

Personnel 
The Mills Brothers
Orchestra:
 Frank Foster (tenor sax)
 Bobby Plater (alto sax)
 Marshal Royal (alto sax)
 Eric Dixon (tenor sax)
 Charles Fowlkes (baritone sax)
 Nat Pavone (trumpet) (20 November only)
 Snookie Young (trumpet) (21 November only)
 Al Aarons (trumpet)
 Gene Goe (trumpet)
 Ernie Royal (trumpet)
 Bill Hughes (trombone)
 Grover Mitchell (trombone)
 Dick Boone (trombone)
 Harlen Floyd (trombone)
 Count Basie (piano)
 Freddie Green (guitar)
 Norman Brown (guitar)
 Norman Keenan (bass)
 Sol Gubin (drums

References

Count Basie Orchestra albums
1968 albums
Dot Records albums
Albums conducted by Dick Hyman
Albums arranged by Dick Hyman
Albums produced by Teddy Reig
Mills Brothers albums
Collaborative albums